The 1973 season in Swedish football, starting April 1973 and ending November 1973:

Honours

Official titles

Notes

References 
Online

 
Seasons in Swedish football